Paliurus orientalis is a species of Paliurus native for Yunnan province in China.

References 

Rhamnaceae
Plants described in 1894